Richard Urquhart Goode (December 8, 1858 – June 9, 1903) was an American geographer and topographer with the United States Geological Survey, Northern Transcontinental Railroad Survey, and the Panama Canal Company.

Early life 
Goode was born in Bedford, Virginia. He was the son of Sarah "Sallie" (née Urquhart) and John Goode Jr., a Virginia lawyer, politician and Solicitor General of the United States under President Grover Cleveland.

Goode attended the Hanover Academy in Norfolk, Virginia, and the Norfolk Military Academy also in Norfolk, with his cousin Frank Urquhart. Later, he attended the University of Virginia for several terms where he studied geography.

Goode served as an assistant in the Army's Engineer Corps (now U.S. Army Corps of Engineers) from 1877 to 1878.

Career 
In 1879, Goode received an appointment from the U.S. Secretary of the Interior to be a topographer with the newly created United States Geological Survey (USGS). He was assigned to conduct geographic surveys in Arizona and Utah, resulting in what are now called the USGS Topographic Maps. In 1880, he was promoted to supervisor, charged with a survey of the plateau region north of the Grand Canyon in Colorado. in 1881, he was assigned to oversee the primary triangulation of the area near Fort Wingate in New Mexico.

On May 1, 1882, Goode temporarily resigned from the USGS to be a topographer for the Northern Transcontinental Railroad Survey(also called the Northern Pacific Topographical and Scientific Survey), working in Montana and Washington from 1882 to 1884. On July 23, 1884, Goode rejoined the USGS and supervised surveys in Kansas and Missouri. In 1886, he was supervised surveys in Texas, working alongside another team supervised by his cousin Charles Fox Urquhart. In 1888, Goode took another leave of absence from the USGS—this time as an engineer and astronomer to conduct important topographic surveys addressing property rights on the Isthmus of Darian (now called the Isthmus of Panama) for the Panama Canal Company.

In 1889, Goode rejoined the USGS and was promoted to the position of geographer in charge of the Southern Central Division of Topography. In September 1890, the USGS restructured its Topographic Branch into two divisions—Eastern and Western—and Goode was placed in charge of the Kansas-Texas Section of Western Division. In August 1894, Goode was placed in charge of the more important Pacific Section, including California, Oregon, Arizona, Colorado, Nevada, Washington and Alaska. 

Goode worked on the boundary between the United States and Canada in 1898. In 1898, Goode spoke about "The Bitterroot Forest Preserve," now a national forest, at a meeting of the National Geographic Society at the Columbian University (later George Washington University). In 1900, Goode presented a lecture, "The Topographic Work of the United States Geological Survey," at the California Academy of Sciences.  

In June 1903, Goode was placed in charge of the entire Western Division which included all lands west of the Mississippi River. His offices were in Washington, D.C. requiring Goode to return to the East Coast when it was not the summer mapping season. Goode oversaw the Western Division until his death.

Professional affiliations 
Goode was a member of the Washington Academy of Sciences, the National Geographic Society, and the Cosmos Club where he was also an officer. From 1901 to 1903, he was the chairman of the Committee on Technical Meetings at the National Geographic Society.

Honors
Several mountains were named in his honor:

 Mount Goode, a 10,610 foot summit located in the Chugach Mountains of Alaska was named for him in 1924.

 Goode Mountain, the highest peak in North Cascades National Park and fourth highest in Chelan County, Washington—which Goode surveyed in 1883. 
 Goode Glacier, rises over a vertical mile above the North Fork Bridge Creek valley floor on the northeast face of Goode Mountain, Northern Cascades National Park
 Mount Goode, a 13,085-foot summit on the crest of the Sierra Nevada in Kings Canyon National Park of California, officially named in 1926.

Personal 
In 1889, Goode married Sophie Jackson Parks (born November 20, 1860) of Norfolk, Virginia, and the couple resided in Washington, D.C. Parks was the daughter of Marshall Ott Parks—Commodore in the Confederate Navy, member of the Virginia legislature, a hotelier, railroad man, president of the Dismal Swamp Canal Company, and Supervising Inspector of Steamboats under President Grover Cleveland. 

In 1894, they hired architect Victor Mindeleff to design a three-story stone and brick Colonial–style house for them in the Washington, D.C. neighborhood Lanier Heights. In 1898, Goode was elected to the vestry of St. Margaret's Episcopal Church in Washington, D.C. They had three children: Sophie Parks Goode, Sallie Urquhart Goode, and Richard Alexander Goode. 

At the age of 45 years, Goode died unexpectedly of pneumonia in Rockville, Maryland on July 9, 1903.

Publications

Journals and Books 
 Analyses of Rocks from the Laboratory of the United States Geological Survey 1880–1899. With Frank Wigglesworth Clarke, Henry Gannett, and Fred Boughton Weeks. United States Geological Survey, 1900.
 "Bitter Root Forest Reserve," National Geographic Magazine, September 1898, Vol. 9 Issue 9, p11–24.
 "Boundaries of the United States and of the Several States and Territories, with an Outline of the History of All Important Changes of Territory," with Henry Gannett. United States Geological Survey Issues 170-172, 1900.
 "The Geography and Geology of Alaska: A Summary of Existing Knowledge," with Alfred Hulse Brooks and Cleveland Abbe. United States Geological Survey Professional Paper No. 45, 1906.
 The Goode Diary: A Personal Journal of the Northern Transcontinental Survey, 1883. W. S. Dawson, 1990.
 "Height of Mt. Rainier," National Geographic Magazine, March 1898, Vol. 9 Issue 3, p. 97–98.
 "The Idaho-Montana Boundary Line," National Geographic Magazine. January 1900, Vol. 11, Issue 1. pages 23–28.
 "Magnetic Declination." West Virginia Geological and Economic Survey, Vol. 1, 1899
 "The Northwestern Boundary between the United States and Canada," Journal of the American Geographical Society of New York, Vol. 32, No. 5 (1900), pp. 465–470
 "Results of Primary Triangulation and Primary Traverse, Fiscal Year 1901-2." with H. M. Wilson, J. H. Renshaw, and E. M. Douglas. Bulletin of the United States Geological Survey No. 201, 1902
 "Results of Spirit-Leveling, Fiscal Year 1900-1901," Bulletin of the US Geological Survey No. 185, 1901
 "Survey of the Boundary Line between Idaho and Montana, from the International Boundary to the Crest of the Bitterroot Mountains," Bulletin of the United States Geological Survey, No. 170, 1900
 "Triangulation, Primary Traverse and Spirit Leveling: 1896/97-1899." with Herbert Michael Wilson, John Henry Renshawe, and E. M. Douglas. Annual Report of the United States Geological Survey to the Secretary of the Interior, 1900.
 "A Trip to Panama and Darien." National Geographic Magazine Vol. 1, No. 4, 1889.

Maps 
The following is an incomplete listing of maps by Goode. The following topographic maps were issued by the United States Geological Survey and were documented in WorldCat. Note that Goode is credited for his original triangulation or work on all future editions of maps that rely on that data.

References

External links
 

1858 births
1903 deaths
American people of Scottish descent
People from Bedford, Virginia
University of Virginia alumni
United States Army Corps of Engineers personnel
United States Geological Survey personnel
American geographers
American engineers
American topographers
People from Maryland
National Geographic Society
19th-century American Episcopalians
19th-century American non-fiction writers
Deaths from pneumonia in Maryland